Neighbourhood components analysis is a supervised learning method for classifying multivariate data into distinct classes according to a given distance metric over the data. Functionally, it serves the same purposes as the K-nearest neighbors algorithm, and makes direct use of a related concept termed stochastic nearest neighbours.

Definition 
Neighbourhood components analysis aims at "learning" a distance metric by finding a linear transformation of input data such that the average leave-one-out (LOO) classification performance is maximized in the transformed space. This use of the algorithm therefore addresses the issue of model selection.

Explanation 
In order to define , we define an objective function describing classification accuracy in the transformed space and try to determine  such that this objective function is maximized.

Leave-one-out (LOO) classification 
Consider predicting the class label of a single data point by consensus of its -nearest neighbours with a given distance metric. This is known as leave-one-out classification. However, the set of nearest-neighbours  can be quite different after passing all the points through a linear transformation.

Solution 
We can resolve this difficulty by using an approach inspired by stochastic gradient descent. Rather than considering the -nearest neighbours at each transformed point in LOO-classification, we'll consider the entire transformed data set as stochastic nearest neighbours. We define these using a softmax function of the squared Euclidean distance between a given LOO-classification point and each other point in the transformed space:

The probability of correctly classifying data point  is the probability of classifying the points of each of its neighbours with the same class :

 where  is the probability of classifying neighbour  of point .

Define the objective function using LOO classification, this time using the entire data set as stochastic nearest neighbours:

Note that under stochastic nearest neighbours, the consensus class for a single point  is the expected value of a point's class in the limit of an infinite number of samples drawn from the distribution over its neighbours  i.e.: . Thus the predicted class is an affine combination of the classes of every other point, weighted by the softmax function for each  where  is now the entire transformed data set.

Obtaining a gradient for  means that it can be found with an iterative solver such as conjugate gradient descent. Note that in practice, most of the innermost terms of the gradient evaluate to insignificant contributions due to the rapidly diminishing contribution of distant points from the point of interest. This means that the inner sum of the gradient can be truncated, resulting in reasonable computation times even for large data sets.

Alternative formulation 

A natural alternative is the KL-divergence, which induces the following objective function and gradient:" (Goldberger 2005)

In practice, optimization of  using this function tends to give similar performance results as with the original.

History and background 
Neighbourhood components analysis was developed by Jacob Goldberger, Sam Roweis, Ruslan Salakhudinov, and Geoff Hinton at the University of Toronto's department of computer science in 2004.

See also
Spectral clustering
Large margin nearest neighbor

References 
J. Goldberger, G. Hinton, S. Roweis, R. Salakhutdinov. (2005) Neighbourhood Components Analysis. Advances in Neural Information Processing Systems. 17, 513–520, 2005.

External links

Software 
 The MLPACK library contains a C++ implementation
 nca (C++)
 scikit-learn's "NeighborhoodComponentsAnalysis" implementation (Python)

Statistical classification